Het Luitboek van Thysius is a book of music for the lute. It was written by Adriaen Smout from Rotterdam, who started at the University of Leiden in 1595 and later became a notable counter-Reformation preacher.

It was acquired shortly after Smout's death by Joan Thys (Latinised into Thysius), a Leiden book collector, after whom it is named—Thys' library (including the Luitboek) still survives today in Leiden's Rapenburg as the Bibliotheca Thysiana. A reprint of the book was published in 2009.

Publication
 Adriaen Smout: The Thysius Lute Book / Het luitboek van Thysius. 3 vols., Leiden & Utrecht. 2009. .

External links
Description at Meertens Instituut

Renaissance music
Dutch music
Compositions for lute
Renaissance music manuscript sources